The Nokia E60 is a traditional candybar style smartphone from the Eseries business phone range, an S60 3rd Edition Symbian device. It was introduced on 12 October 2005 along with Nokia E61 and Nokia E70.

Key features 

 Symbian OS v9.1, Series 60 3rd Edition
 64 MB internal memory
 WLAN (WiFi) with SIP compliant VoIP client
 Bluetooth 1.2, Infrared and USB support
 EGSM 900, GSM 1800, GSM 1900 and WCDMA
 Web browser based on WebKit
 352 × 416 pixel full colour LCD
 no Radio
 no camera
 115 mm × 49 mm × 16.9 mm, 117 grams

See also
 Nokia Eseries
 List of Nokia products

References

External links
 Nokia E60 Product Page (No longer working)
 Nokia E60 Device details  (No longer working)
 Nokia E60 preview on All about Symbian

Reviews
  Nokia E60 - International Review roundup by global review aggregator alaTest.com
 E60 Reviews and specifications round-up
 GSM Arena
 infoSync World
 Mobile Review - part 1 and part 2
 Nokia E60 Review on about-nokia.com
 Nokia E60 Review by Softpedia

Mobile phones introduced in 2005
Nokia ESeries
Mobile phones with infrared transmitter
Mobile phones with user-replaceable battery